Gérald Neveu (August 10, 1921, Marseille - February 28, 1960, Paris) was a French poet. Called by some "one of the gentlest poètes maudits", he was born to Louis Neveu and Marthe Bonnaud in Marseille. Having lost his family and job and having become an alcoholic, he lived as a hobo and dreamer  in Marseille sleeping in friends's studios, homeless shelters or psychiatric clinics (together with Artaud he went through electroshocks). Since 1947 he was a member of the French Communist Party. In 1950 he befriended Jean Malrieu with whom he created the magazine . A few months before his death he came to Paris where he was found dead one day; the cause of his death remains unknown. His wallet contained only a piece of paper saying "without hair, without teeth, without money, without a woman, without an apartment etc."

Selected bibliography 
He worked with the famous review Les Cahiers du Sud and also with Action Poétique.

1960: Les Sept commandements
1967: Fournaise obscure
1973: Une solitude essentielle
1992: Poèmes 1945-1960
1993: Comme les loups vont au désir : toujours pour toi, Éditions Comp'act, Seyssel

References and external links 

 Gérald Neveu, in French

1921 births
1960 deaths
Writers from Marseille
Poètes maudits
20th-century French poets
French male poets
20th-century French male writers